Frederic Wilhelm C. J. Sjöström (born 8 January 1987), known professionally as Freddie Stroma, is an English actor and model. He is known for his work in roles including Cormac McLaggen in the Harry Potter film series, Adam Cromwell on the Lifetime series Unreal, Brit Vayner in 13 Hours: The Secret Soldiers of Benghazi (2016), H.G. Wells in the ABC series Time After Time, and Adrian Chase/Vigilante in the DC Extended Universe series Peacemaker.

Early life 
Stroma was born 8 January 1987 in London, England, to father Stefan Sjöström, a Swedish-born computer industry executive, and  German mother Crystal Kupper, and grew up in Ascot, England in Berkshire, about 25 miles west of London. He was educated at Sunningdale School and the boys-only boarding school Radley College in Oxfordshire, leaving in 2005. He has an older sister, Antonia Sjöström, and a younger brother, Philipp Sjöström.

When he was 16, Stroma was accepted to the National Youth Theatre of Great Britain. He had roles on various British TV shows, including Casualty and BBC's detective show, Mayo (aka The Gil Mayo Mysteries). While studying neuroscience at University College London, Stroma continued to work as an actor and model. He took a year off from university to play the role of Cormac McLaggen in Harry Potter and the Half-Blood Prince. After filming was over, Stroma completed his degree at University College London. In 2009, he attained a 2:1 BSc (an upper-second-class degree) in Neuroscience.

Career
During his time at university, Stroma was cast in the role as Cormac McLaggen first in Harry Potter and the Half Blood Prince, a role he reprised in Harry Potter and the Deathly Hallows – Parts 1 and 2.

Stroma played the role of Cool Brett in the crime-thriller film 4.3.2.1.

Stroma appeared in the direct-to-DVD romantic film A Cinderella Story: Once Upon a Song as a British student, Luke Morgan. He played opposite Katie Gibbs (played by Lucy Hale) as her love interest.

He had a minor role in Pitch Perfect, a 2012 comedy about the world of collegiate a cappella choirs.  He played a radio station manager at the local college radio station.

In 2014, he was cast in the role of Jack in the psychological thriller After the Dark, which was formerly known as The Philosophers, with his former Harry Potter co-star Bonnie Wright. The film was shot on location in Jakarta.

In June 2015, Stroma was one of the romantic interests, Adam Cromwell, in the Lifetime dramedy Unreal. He plays British bachelor who is competing on a fictionalized The Bachelor-type reality show called Everlasting. Stroma's character is manipulated as much as the women who are vying for his attention in the show that is a behind-the-scenes view of reality dating shows.

Unreal was picked up for a second season but Stroma had said that he does not think his character will be back. However, during a Paley Center panel on Unreal he said that he is hopeful as the show will continue to feature Everlasting. After the season 1 finale, Sarah Gertrude Shapiro, one of the co-creators of Unreal, confirmed that Stroma would be back in season 2.

Stroma had a role in the Michael Bay film 13 Hours: The Secret Soldiers of Benghazi (2016), playing Yale University graduate student Brit Vayner, an undercover CIA officer in Libya.

In 2020, he played a guest role on Netflix's period drama Bridgerton, appearing as Prince Frederick of Prussia opposite Phoebe Dynevor and Regé-Jean Page.

Personal life 
Stroma said he modelled (and acted) to help pay for university. He modelled for Acne Underwear in their Underwear Collection Autumn/Winter 2008. He uses Stroma as a surname instead of Sjöström because there is an NHL player named Fredrik Sjöström. Stroma plays guitar and can sing but he is not classically trained in either.

Stroma began dating his Unreal co-star Johanna Braddy in the summer of 2015. Stroma and Braddy got engaged in May 2016, and were married on 30 December 2016, in Atlanta, Georgia.

Filmography

Discography

References

External links 

 

1987 births
Living people
English male television actors
English male film actors
Male actors from London
English people of German descent
English people of Swedish descent
English expatriates in the United States
People educated at Radley College
English male models
Alumni of University College London
21st-century English male actors
National Youth Theatre members
People educated at Sunningdale School